Ntombela kaMalandela (c. 1590-c. 1655) the son of Malandela kaLuzumana, was the proto-chieftain of the Zulu nation in the late 17th century. He was succeeded by his younger brother Zulu kaMalandela.

Zulu kings
17th-century African people
Year of birth uncertain